Fakhraly may refer to:
Fərəhli, Azerbaijan
Fəxralı, Azerbaijan